Michael Ross (born c. 1960/1961) is a Canadian-Israeli expert on intelligence gathering and a former Mossad officer, or "combatant" with a focus upon human source intelligence collection (Humint). Ross speaks upon intelligence issues and publishes articles, and he is the author of the book The Volunteer: The Incredible True Story of an Israeli Spy on the Trail of International Terrorists. Ross advocates vigilance and the continual improvement of intelligence collection systems in order to protect free societies. In August 2007, Ross authored an article in the Canadian daily, National Post entitled, "Obama got it right" wherein he wrote that Osama bin Laden was hiding in Pakistan having been provided sanctuary by Pakistan's Directorate for Inter-Service Intelligence (ISI). Ross urged then presidential nominee, Barack Obama, to engage in unilateral intelligence and military action in Pakistan to hunt and kill al-Qaeda leaders including Osama bin Laden.

Early biography 
Ross was born and raised as an Anglican in Canada. He grew up in Victoria, British Columbia. Following high school, he joined the Canadian Forces, and served in the since-disbanded Canadian Airborne Regiment of the Special Service Force at CFB Petawawa. After he was discharged, he toured Europe. In 1982, he arrived in Israel, planning to volunteer on a kibbutz before returning to Canada. After living in Israel for a while and becoming romantically involved with a member of the kibbutz named Dahlia, Ross decided stay and convert to Judaism. Ross subsequently settled on a kibbutz, completed his Judaism studies and successfully converted, and married Dahlia. Ross was conscripted into the Israel Defense Forces and assigned to the Combat Engineering Corps. He served in the West Bank, where his unit conducted patrols and searches for wanted terrorists and terror cells. In 1985, he was transferred to a demolitions platoon of the Golani Brigade and deployed to the Israeli security zone in southern Lebanon. His unit was tasked with keeping the roads free of ambushes and IEDs. His only combat experience was when he participated in an ambush on two Hezbollah vehicles, during which eight militants were killed.

Mossad career 
After the end of his military service, Ross returned to his kibbutz, and during this time, the Mossad interviewed him. He took a leave of absence from the kibbutz to return to Canada with his wife, and worked in a federal government job in Vancouver for two years before returning to Israel, where he reestablished contact with the Mossad via a telephone number through a card he had been given before leaving. After repeated interviews, a medical examination and a polygraph test, he was put through an intense training program, and in 1989, he was accepted into the Mossad. As part of his preparation for service in the Mossad, Ross attended the London School of Economics. He served under a form of non-official cover, which involves working under covers other than as an Israeli diplomat and therefore lacks diplomatic immunity, a status which the Mossad refers to as "combatant". Ross's background and language skills gave him excellent access to sources of intelligence and the ability to travel without suspicion of being an Israeli officer. Ross's work was primarily as an undercover agent in various foreign countries. For many years was the Mossad's man in Sub-Saharan Africa. Although primarily a field operative, he also worked at Mossad headquarters for two and a half years in an official liaison position with the American Central Intelligence Agency and FBI Counterterrorism Division of the Federal Bureau of Investigation. In 2000, Ross was awarded a divisional citation by former Mossad Deputy Director and Head of the National Security Council, Ilan Mizrahi. Ross left the Mossad under honorable circumstances in late 2001 with the equivalent military rank of Sgan Aluf (Lieutenant-Colonel). He subsequently divorced and returned to Canada.

Ross's work with the Mossad was spent almost entirely in counter-terrorism. According to his book, he played an integral part in the investigation and subsequent joint operation with the FBI that resulted in the capture of Fawzi Mustapha Assi, a Hezbollah operative procuring weapons technology in the United States. Assi was procuring weapons material at the behest of senior Hezbollah leaders, Imad Mughniyeh and Hassan Hilu al-Lakkis. In addition to sub-Saharan Africa, he wrote that he served in the Mossad's CAESAREA division in Syria, Azerbaijan, North Africa, and Iran. At Mossad headquarters he was involved with the TEVEL division, responsible for liaison relationships with allied governments on counter-terrorism, specifically in prevention and investigation of attacks upon embassies. Ross played an integral role in the capture of the al-Qaeda confederates responsible for the 1998 United States embassy bombings in Kenya and Tanzania. He later served in the Mossad's BITZUR division, responsible for prevention of terrorist attacks upon Jewish communities worldwide. Ross assisted the escape of Jews from Zimbabwe threatened by the Robert Mugabe regime. Ross is credited with bolstering intelligence ties between Israel and Azerbaijan and the interception of two Iranian agents attempting to procure weaponry in South Africa.

Ross' book has received criticism. Haaretz journalist Yossi Melman claimed that Ross magnified and glorified his adventures and claimed to have participated in operations which it is doubtful he was involved in, however, this has been disputed by CIA, Mossad, and foreign news sources. Melman wrote that sources who knew him within the Mossad told Haaretz that Ross was never in Iran, and that he was stationed only in "base countries", or countries with which Israel has relations with, and not "target countries" (Arab countries and Iran). Melman claimed that his former colleagues also said that he remained in a junior position throughout his 13 years of service, and resigned due to bitterness about not being promoted and under a cloud due to discipline problems. This has been disputed by foreign news outlets as Israeli media are often co-opted by official government sources. Melman later appeared to contradict himself where he wrote that Ross, according to foreign news outlets, played a pivotal role in the capture of the perpetrators of the Africa embassy bombings in Baku, Azerbaijan. In an interview, former Mossad operative Mishka Ben-David claimed to have known Ross, but said that his book is "not credible" and not a worthwhile source from which to learn of the Mossad's work. On the other hand, Ben-David has been heavily criticized in Israel for exaggerating his exploits within the Mossad. Publishers Weekly described Ross' discussions of intelligence operations as realistic and not movie-like.

Book publication 
Ross wrote The Volunteer in 2007. The tone of the book is pro-Israeli; Ross sees Israel as an example of civilization's defense against terrorism. He does not appear to draw distinctions between the aims of Islamist Palestinian nationalism and al-Qaeda's stated goal to drive Americans and western influence out of all Muslim nations. Ross often cites examples where Iran covertly supports and sponsors Sunni terrorist movements such as al-Qaeda, Palestinian Islamic Jihad and Hamas as well as the Taliban.

Publications

Book 
 The Volunteer: The Incredible True Story of an Israeli Spy on the Trail of International Terrorists, Skyhorse Publishing, September 2007, .

Association with Ishmael Jones 
Ross is a friend of Ishmael Jones, a former deep-cover CIA officer and author of The Human Factor: Inside the CIA's Dysfunctional Intelligence Culture, with whom he collaborates. There is speculation that Ross and Jones operated against similar intelligence targets while working for their respective clandestine services.

Articles 
"Tracing Back Syria's Chemical Warfare Stockpile to the Gulf War" by Ronen Bergman, Al-Monitor, August 24, 2012.
"Rule No. 1 for would-be spies - stay away from the embassy" by Michael Ross, National Post, January 24, 2012.
"Confessions of a Mossad spy" by Kathryn Blaze Carlson, National Post, January 14, 2012.
"Our national-security amateur hour" by Michael Ross, National Post, November 16, 2011.
"Send a message to Assad" by Michael Ross, National Post, October 5, 2011.
"University of Lethbridge distances itself from truther grad" by Michael Ross, National Post, September 28, 2011.
"Lethbridge student rising to top of conspiracy theory class" by Michael Ross, National Post, September 23, 2011.
"Arab spring renders the left even less coherent than usual" by Michael Ross, National Post, September 21, 2011.
"UN rules that Israeli blockade is legal in blow to failing flotilla" by Michael Ross, National Post, July 8, 2011.
"Witless Hamas apologists denounce Israel from sunny Greece" by Michael Ross, National Post, July 4, 2011.
"al-Qaeda's sour new face has a Canadian connection" by Michael Ross, National Post, May 19, 2011.
"Obama strikes a blow against duplicity in Pakistan" by Michael Ross, National Post, May 2, 2011.
"Gaza's death sentence for a well-meaning naif" by Michael Ross, National Post, April 18, 2011.
"Syria’s special place as the Middle East’s mafioso" by Michael Ross, National Post, March 30, 2011.
"Canada needs a dedicated clandestine foreign intelligence service" by Michael Ross, National Post, February 15, 2011.
"Mini-Book review-Ross-The Volunteer: A Canadian's Secret Life in the Mossad" by James McCormick, Chicago Boyz, September 24, 2010.
"Bureaucracy Kills" by Michael Ross and Ishmael Jones, National Post, January 11, 2010.
"Israel: Mossad Hit Didn’t Upset Intel Ties" by Eli Lake, Washington Times, February 25, 2010.
"Israeli Passport Row is just Political Theatre" by Michael Ross, National Post, March 25, 2010.
"Obama's Iran dilemma" by Michael Ross, National Post, January 2, 2009.
"No intelligence" by Michael Ross, Maclean's Magazine, August 6, 2008.
"Good-bye, Zimbabwe" by Michael Ross, Maclean's Magazine, June 4, 2008.
"The Iran hawks' latest surge" by Gregory Levy, Salon.com, March 7, 2008.
"A true arch-terrorist" by Michael Ross , National Post,  February 15, 2008.
"Jews are news" by Michael Ross , National Post, December 29, 2008.
"Obama got it right" by Michael Ross, National Post, August 8, 2007.

See also 

Non-official cover

References

External links 
Mossad (English)
Interview with Michael Ross

1965 births
Converts to Judaism from Anglicanism
Israeli spies
Espionage writers
Israeli memoirists
Living people
Post–Cold War spies
War on terror
20th-century memoirists